Joe Burks (July 8, 1899 – July 6, 1968) was an American professional football player who was a center in the National Football League (NFL). He played with the Milwaukee Badgers during the 1926 NFL season.

References

1899 births
1968 deaths
American football centers
Washington State Cougars football players
Milwaukee Badgers players
Players of American football from Michigan
Sportspeople from Houma, Louisiana